The Chiatura mine is a large mine complex located near the town of Chiatura in central-western Georgia in the Imereti region west of the national capital Tbilisi.

Chiatura represents the largest manganese reserve in Georgia and one of the largest in the world, having estimated reserves of 239 million tonnes of manganese ore grading around 26% manganese metal.

History 
The deposit was discovered in 1879 by the Georgian poet Akaki Tsereteli who explored the area in search of manganese and iron ores. The deposit was finally proven to be commercial and the JSC Chiaturmanganese company (JSC Chiaturmanganumi) was set up to manage and exploit the huge deposit. The gross-balance of workable manganese ores of all commercial categories is estimated as 239 million tonnes, which include manganese oxide ores - 41.6%, carbonate ores - 39%, and peroxide ores - 19%.

Prior to World War I, the German Krupp family was one of the leading investors in the mining operations at Chiaturi.  In 1913 the mine produced 1 million tonnes of manganese ore, half the world's output.  By the early 1920s output was only one-third of that 1913 peak, owing both to Bolshevic property confiscations and the withdrawal of foreign investment.  In 1924, the American financier W. Averell Harriman became interested in an investment deal that would revive production.  In an ill-fated deal with a Soviet government eager to ink a deal with a politically connected American investor so as to assist in its efforts to achieve diplomatic recognition from the United States government, Harriman capitalized the Georgian Manganese Company with $4 million of his own money, agreeing to pay fixed royalties per tonne to both the Soviet government and the previous Georgian mine owners.  It would serve as the foreign centerpiece of Lenin's New Economic Policy.  In its first year of operations, 1925, Harriman's company increased the mine's production from 436,000 tonnes to 772,000 tonnes.  Thereafter, however, the Harriman venture quickly soured as global manganese prices fell and planned infrastructure  improvements at the mine and on the railroad to Poti increased dramatically.  By 1928, Harriman saw that continued operations at Chiaturi were not economically feasible and he negotiated a buyout agreement with the Soviet government.

The mine is currently owned by Georgian Manganese Holding, a subsidiary of the British company Stemcor, and is part of a holding which also includes the Zestaponi ferroalloy plant and the Vartzikha hydropower station. The Chiatura mine complex which includes four underground mines and three open pit quarries has an annual production capacity of 1.18 million tonnes of manganese ore and 400,000 tonnes of manganese concentrates. The mine complex transports its manganese ore by rail to the ferroalloy plant located in Zestaponi.

In 2017, City of the Sun, an award-winning documentary film directed by Rati Oneli, follows several citizens of the city.

References 

Manganese mines in Georgia (country)
Mines in the Soviet Union